Pedro Manuel Valido Franco (born 13 March 1970) is a Portuguese former footballer who played as a central defender. Currently, he is an assistant coach for Benfica B in Liga Portugal 2.

Starting out in the youth teams of Benfica, he amassed a total of 1 goal in 150 games in the Primeira Liga over the course of a career with eight different clubs.

Valido earned 26 caps for Portugal from under-18 to under-21 level, winning the 1989 World Championship with the under-20 side.

Club career
Born in Lisbon, Valido started playing football as an 11-year-old at local Desportivo Domingos Sávio, finishing his development at S.L. Benfica. In 1988, he joined G.D. Estoril Praia on a loan deal, going on to spend one season in the Segunda Liga. It was followed by loans to Feirense and Gil Vicente.

During his spell at the Estádio da Luz, Valido only appeared once in the Primeira Liga (four competitive games), facing stiff competition from Rui Bento, Paulo Madeira and Wiliam. Prior to his release in June 1992, he was also loaned to fellow league clubs C.D. Feirense and Gil Vicente FC.

Valido then signed with C.S. Marítimo, contributing 30 appearances and one goal in his first year and helping the Madeirans to qualify to the UEFA Cup for the first time in their history. He subsequently became a journeyman, appearing for four teams in the top division before dropping down to the third level in 1999 and the fourth in 2003.

Valido retired in 2005, at the age of 35. He returned to Benfica two years later, working as assistant manager in several youth sides while also becoming a sports pundit on Benfica TV.

International career
Valido was part of the Portugal squad that appeared at the 1989 FIFA World Youth Championship, held in Saudi Arabia. He played in every minute in every game in what turned out to be a conquest, featuring alongside Benfica teammates Fernando Brassard, Madeira, Abel Silva and Paulo Sousa.

Valido made his debut for the under-21s on 25 April 1989.

References

External links

1970 births
Living people
Footballers from Lisbon
Portuguese footballers
Association football defenders
Primeira Liga players
Liga Portugal 2 players
Segunda Divisão players
S.L. Benfica footballers
G.D. Estoril Praia players
C.D. Feirense players
Gil Vicente F.C. players
C.S. Marítimo players
C.F. Estrela da Amadora players
F.C. Tirsense players
C.F. Os Belenenses players
F.C. Felgueiras players
F.C. Alverca players
Amora F.C. players
Atlético Clube de Portugal players
Seixal F.C. players
GD Beira-Mar players
Portugal youth international footballers
Portugal under-21 international footballers
Portuguese football managers